Kalkut is a census town in the Matigara CD block in the Siliguri subdivision of Darjeeling district  in the state of West Bengal, India.

Geography

Location

Area overview
The map alongside shows the Siliguri subdivision of Darjeeling district. This area is spread across the foothills of the Himalayas and is a plain land gently sloping from north to south. While the northern part is mentioned as the Terai region, the larger southern portion forms the western part of the Dooars region. While 55.11% per cent of the population resides in the rural areas, 44.89% resides in the urban areas. On the western side the Mechi River forms a long border with Nepal. On the eastern side the Mahananda River forms a short border with Bangladesh.

Note: The map alongside presents some of the notable locations in the subdivision. All places marked in the map are linked in the larger full screen map.

Demographics
According to the 2011 Census of India, Kalkut had a total population of 9,184 of which 4,765 (52%) were males and 4,419 (48%) were females. There were 1,102 persons in the age range of 0 to 6 years. The total number of literate people in Kalkut was 6,329 (68.91% of the population over 6 years).

Infrastructure
According to the District Census Handbook 2011, Darjiling, Kalkut covered an area of 1.4812 km2. Among the civic amenities, it had 12 km roads with open drains, the protected water supply involved overhead tank, tap water from treated sources and spring, it had 797 domestic electric connections and 30 road lighting points. Among the medical facilities, it had 1 dispensary/ health centre, 1 maternity home, 8 medicine shops. Among the educational facilities it had were 5 primary schools, 1 secondary school, 1 senior secondary school, 1 non-formal education centre (Sarva Siksha Abiyan). It had the branches of 1 cooperative bank and 1 non-agricultural credit society.

Education
Amiyo Palchoudhury Smriti Vidyalaya is a Bengalii-medium coeducational institution established in 2001. It has facilities for teaching from class V to class XII.

References

Cities and towns in Darjeeling district